GTAA may refer to:

 Grand Theft Auto Advance, an alternate name to the Grand Theft Auto game for the Game Boy Advance
 Georgia Tech Athletic Association, a non-profit organization
 Global Tactical Asset Allocation, a top-down investment strategy
 Greater Toronto Airports Authority, an airport operator